Pauni  Taluka, is a Taluka in Bhandara subdivision of Bhandara district in Maharashtra State of India.

Demographics 
As per Indian government census of 2011, the population was 154588.

Settlements in Pauni Taluka

 Pauni - Municipal seat
 Adyal
 Kurza

Geographic Boundaries

References 

Talukas in Maharashtra
Bhandara district